WLBQ (1570 AM), known locally on air as "BeechTree Radio," or simply as "The Q", is a radio station  broadcasting a Classic Hits format. Licensed to Morgantown, Kentucky, United States, the station is currently owned by Beech Tree Publishing. Its transmitter is located along South Main Street (US 231/KY 79), and the studios are located at 107 West Ohio Street in downtown Morgantown.

History
WLBQ's construction permit was granted by the FCC on November 13, 1975, with the call letters assigned on March 1, 1976. The station first signed on the air sometime in August 1976 when it became fully licensed. Its original owner was Joseph W. Meyers, doing business as Lincoln Broadcasting based in Hodgenville, Kentucky. The station was operated under the licensee name of Lincoln Broadcasting, which was renamed Butler County Broadcasting at some time in the 1977-1978 winter season. In June 1979, the station and the stock in Butler County Broadcasting was sold to the late Charles Black, who was also serving as mayor of Morgantown at the time. He, along with his wife Mary Alice, managed the station for almost three decades.
Butler County Broadcasting was renamed BeechTree Publishing sometime in the late 2000s, hence the previous branding that was used by the station until 2015.

For most of its first 38 years on the air, WLBQ was one of only three radio stations in Kentucky to not have a co-owned FM sister station; the other two were WEKT in Elkton and WFKN in Franklin. However, on May 20, 2014, WLBQ was granted a construction permit for a new FM translator, W268CE, licensed to Morgantown, broadcasting at 101.5 on the FM dial, operating on 250 watts of effective radiated power, transmitting from a tower along Veterans Way near the Charles Black City Park in Morgantown. The new translator signed on the air on the morning of August 21, 2014 during WLBQ's morning program, Out On A Limb, thus ending the station's lack of FM companionship. After the FM translator began simulcasting the AM signal, by September 2014, the station began branding by their FM frequency. After launching their FM translator, the station now occasionally competes with in-town rival WWKN (a repeater of Brownsville-licensed WKLX) and oldies station WXMZ in nearby Hartford, in neighboring Ohio County.

In Fall 2015, WLBQ, in conjunction with the Butler County High School, began the Broadcasting and Media Class at the high school, providing high school students an opportunity to learn the behind-the-scenes work in the radio industry. The class included how to write for radio, including commercials, promos, and newscasts. That class took part in WLBQ's broadcast of senior night activities during a BCHS basketball broadcast, including pre- and post-game programming, and color analogy during the game.

In December 2018, in order to broaden its FM coverage, WLBQ launched a second low-power translator, W278DA, broadcasting at 103.5 megahertz. Although it is licensed to Caneyville, in neighboring Grayson County, W278DA's transmission tower is located at the junction of State Highway 79 and Brooklyn Road (KY 340) south of Welchs Creek, in the northeastern portion of Butler County.

Local news and programming
WLBQ's news department is Butler County's only news source without stories from other areas. Their news department uses the moniker "Beech Tree News."

Out On a Limb is the local radio show that focuses on current issues and public affairs in Butler County. The show is hosted by John Embry, and is broadcast on Mondays, Tuesdays, Thursdays and Fridays at 7:00 am, with replays at 10:00 am and 7:00 pm. In the mid 2010s, the program had a spinoff show, The Leadership Limb, a "leadership edition" of Out on A Limb. It was broadcast on Wednesdays at 7 a.m., with same replay times, with Jim Green and Landon Hampton hosting.

Prior to 2014, the local newscasts at 12 noon and 4 p.m. every day consisted of these segments in broadcast order: Local news, obituaries, local sports, community news, swap shop, and weather. WLBQ also broadcast statewide news updates from the Kentucky News Network, a statewide network that brings news headlines from across Kentucky. On Sundays, WLBQ also broadcast locally based religious radio shows, including broadcasts of worship services from local churches. The newscasts have since shortened to 5 to 10 minutes long, including local and state news and obituaries. 

As of 2015, the station broadcasts a full-service format with local news, and the station plays music from four genres of music, including Classic Top 40, Hot Adult Contemporary, Classic Country, and Classic Rock; most songs played on the station were released no later than 1999, with a few exceptions. In addition to its music, news and public affairs programming, WLBQ is the exclusive radio home of sporting events involving the teams of Butler County High School, home of the Butler County Bears. Sporting Events include football, boys and girls basketball, baseball, and softball. Most of the station's broadcasts of Butler County Bears football and basketball games are also accompanied with live video coverage of the games through the station's Facebook page via Facebook Live. Prior to 2021, additional sports-related content was provided by the Kentucky News Network's sports division. On Sunday mornings from 6 a.m. to 12 Noon Central time, the station also broadcasts church services by various churches in the area. 

In December 2015, WLBQ began providing hourly national news updates from ABC News Radio.

List of local programs
The following is a list of locally produced programs broadcast by WLBQ outside of music programming: 
The Unnamed Radio Show - Smokin' Joe Morris hosts a mix of music, comedy, and commentary. Live daily Noon-4 pm CT. Includes weather updates at :45 past the hour, and ABC News at the top of each hour.
The Ancient Landmark - weekday religious program by the Caneyville Church of Christ (also airs on WXMZ)
Butler County Ag Connection - farm news program.
Butler County Sports Jam - a sports-talk programming devoted to Butler County High School sports, along with Kentucky, Louisville, and WKU sports, and national sports happenings.
Into the Blue - nationally syndicated program featuring bluegrass music.
News at Noon
Your 4 o'clock News 
Out on A Limb

Advertising
WLBQ Beech Tree Radio also offers ads to local businesses in Butler and surrounding counties. Business owners can contact the station by phone or email to place an ad to attract customers. Listeners of the station can also place an ad to be displayed on the web site and in the "Swap Shop" segment of the 12 noon local news that is broadcast every day (including weekends).

On-air staff 
John Embry - Vice Manager and host of Out On A Limb.
Diane Dyer - Vice Manager and host of Out On A Limb.
Brady Jones - Weekdays 6-8 am. Host of Too Early To Tell.
Josh Hampton - Weekdays 8 am-Noon. Host of Mornings with Josh Hampton. 
Joe K. Morris (a.k.a. Smokin' Joe) - Weekdays Noon-4 pm CST. Program Director/Host of The Unnamed Radio Show. 
Cody Donaldson - Weekdays 4-8 pm. Host of Cody Donaldson: Unsupervised. 
James White - host of the Butler County Sports Jam
Landon Hampton - Staff meteorologist at WLBQ  [also produces Facebook Live weather-casts for Bowling Green Daily News' WXorNot Bowling Green.

Coverage area
WLBQ's AM signal covers mainly the Butler County, Kentucky area during the night hours. During the daytime hours, when the signal consumes more power, its signal would cover the same areas as at night, but also reach parts of, if not all, of nearby sections of neighboring counties, like Edmonson, Grayson, Logan, Muhlenberg, Ohio, and Warren counties. Under the right conditions during the daytime, the signal may also reach northern Todd County, and parts of Simpson County. But for best quality when listening to this station, listeners can listen online at the station's website.

Translators
In addition to the main station at 1570 on the AM dial, WLBQ is relayed by an additional 
translator on the FM dial to widen its broadcast area and to provide a better quality radio signal to listeners within the regular WLBQ coverage area.

BeechTree News
The station management is also in charge of a local online news website, BeechTree News. As an alternative to the county's printed newspaper, it was established in 2009 to provide much local news information, along with select news stories from the rest of the state to its online users.

References

External links
Station website
BeechTree News - WLBQ
WLBQ on BlogSpot
About BTN
BeechTree Weather
WLBQ 1570 on Facebook
BeechTree News on Facebook
Beech Tree News YouTube Channel

LBQ
Morgantown, Kentucky
Classic hits radio stations in the United States
Radio stations established in 1976